The 1933 Oregon Webfoots football team represented the University of Oregon during the 1933 college football season.  Led by second-year head coach Prink Callison, Oregon finished the season with an overall record of 9–1 and a 4–1 Pacific Coast Conference (PCC) play, tying with Stanford for the conference title.

Schedule

References

Oregon
Oregon Ducks football seasons
Pac-12 Conference football champion seasons
Oregon Webfoots football